Franco Gibbons (born 1980–83) is a Palauan politician. In January 2018, he became the youngest Governor of Koror. He previously held the position of Vice Speaker of Koror. On 10 June 2021, he announced he would be seeking re-election in the November 2021 election. The other candidates included former Governor Yositaka Adachi, current Speaker Alan Marbou and former Speaker Eyos Rudimch.

References

Living people
Governors of Koror
People from Koror
1980 births